Fotis Gouziotis (born 11 November 1974) is a retired Greek football defender.

References

1974 births
Living people
Greek footballers
Athlitiki Enosi Larissa F.C. players
Panachaiki F.C. players
Paniliakos F.C. players
PAS Giannina F.C. players
Trikala F.C. players
Panargiakos F.C. players
Super League Greece players
Association football defenders
Footballers from Larissa